Yaad Grewal  is an Indian actor who works in Hindi and Punjabi, films and music videos.

Early life
Grewal was born on August 23, 1975 in Bathinda, Punjab. He did his schooling from St. Joseph Convent School in Bathinda and finished his graduation from Pravara Medical College Loni, Ahmednagar.

Career
Grewal has acted in movies including Mitti (2010), Lion of Punjab (2011), Sikander (2013), Himmat Singh, Once Upon ay Time in Mumbai Dobaara! (2013), Phantom (2015), and music videos, including Sadda Haq.  Known for playing villains, he was nominated and won the best performance in Negative Role award for the various films such as Mitti (2010), Lion of Punjab (2010), Sadda Haq (2012). and Toofan Singh (2016).  Recently he was nominated for the movie Fateh in PTC Punjabi Film Award 2015 for his outstanding performance.

Filmography

Music videos

References

External links
 
 
 

1975 births
Living people
Male actors in Punjabi cinema
Male actors in Hindi cinema
Male actors from Punjab, India
Bathinda district